Tragogomphus guineensis is a species of dragonfly in the family Gomphidae. It is endemic to Equatorial Guinea.

Its natural habitat is subtropical or tropical moist lowland forests.

References

Insects of Equatorial Guinea
Gomphidae
Endemic fauna of Equatorial Guinea
Insects described in 1907
Taxonomy articles created by Polbot
Taxobox binomials not recognized by IUCN